Another World is an EP by Antony and the Johnsons released on October 7, 2008 on compact disc and 12" vinyl. It precedes Antony and the Johnsons third album, The Crying Light. The EP features five previously unreleased recordings, including the first single from The Crying Light, "Another World".

The cover is a photograph of Japanese butoh performer Kazuo Ohno, taken by Pierre-Olivier Deschamps in 1984.

Track listing 
 All songs written by Antony.
 "Another World" (4:02)
 "Crackagen" (2:32)
 "Shake That Devil" (5:19)
 "Sing for Me" (2:30)
 "Hope Mountain" (5:11)

Track history 
"Crackagen" is nearly nine years old; the earliest accessible recording of "Crackagen" is from 2003, in a video recording of Antony's performance at the Oni Gallery in Boston. That video is available on Antony and the Johnsons' official discography.

"Shake That Devil," previously known as "Shake That Dog," was performed often on Antony and the Johnsons' 2006-07 tour, with varying lyrics. The studio version features a downtempo intro to the song.

"Another World," "Sing For Me," and "Hope Mountain" are entirely new.

Chart performance 

In 2009 it was awarded a silver certification from the Independent Music Companies Association which indicated sales of at least 30,000 copies throughout Europe.

External links 
 Pitchfork announcement article
 Antony & the Johnsons' Official Website
 Official press release from Secretly Canadian
 Another World video excerpt

References 

2008 EPs
Antony and the Johnsons albums
Rough Trade Records EPs
Secretly Canadian EPs